Qeshlaq-e Beyg Ali may refer to:
 Qeshlaq-e Beyg Ali-ye Olya
 Qeshlaq-e Beyg Ali-ye Sofla
 Qeshlaq-e Beyg Ali-ye Vosta